Bald Knob School District (BKS)  is a public school district based in Bald Knob, Arkansas, United States. Bald Knob Schools Has 3 Schools 
H.L. Lubker Elementary Bald Knob Middle School and Bald Knob High School.

The school district encompasses  of land in White County and Jackson County and serves all of Bald Knob and portions of Bradford, Russell, and Judsonia.

Schools 
  H. L. Lubker Elementary, 
 Bald Knob Middle School, 
 Bald Knob High School,

Extra Classes 

Cheer, Band, E.a.s.t, Dance, Football and Basketball

External links
 
 Bald Knob Area Chamber of Commerce > Schools and Education

Education in Jackson County, Arkansas
Education in White County, Arkansas
School districts in Arkansas
Bald Knob, Arkansas
1965 establishments in Arkansas
School districts established in 1965